DPMO may refer to:
Defects per million opportunities, a measure of process performance
Defense Prisoner of War/Missing Personnel Office, an agency of the United States Department of Defense
Dopravní podnik města Olomouce, the urban public transport operator of the city of Olomouc in the Czech Republic
"D.P.M.O." (song), a song by British rapper Professor Green